The Journal of the Entomological Research Society is a peer-reviewed scientific journal published by the Gazi Entomological Research Society. It focus on several aspects of entomology, particularly those related to taxonomy, phylogeny, biodiversity, ecology, aquaculture and morphology.

Indexing
The journal is indexed in:

References

External links
Journal of the Entomological Research Society website

Entomology journals and magazines
Publications established in 1999
Academic journals published by learned and professional societies
Triannual journals